Tromsø Midnight Sun Marathon is the northernmost Association of International Marathons and Distance Races certified marathon in the world. The Midnight Sun Marathon is hosted annually by the Norwegian city of Tromsø in June each year.

History
The Midnight Sun Marathon first started in 1990 and has runners from most of the world, attracted by its special feature of running in the midnight sun. The race starts and finishes at the city centre. The runners are facing the Tromsø Bridge after 2 km; an uphill from 6 to 43 meters over sea level. After running about 20 km the runners recross the bridge, and return through the city centre. The field record of the marathon is 2:38:22 for women and 2:20:56 for men.

The 2020 edition of the race was cancelled due to the coronavirus pandemic.

Course records
Male: 	2:20:56 - Knut Hegvold 	  (Norway) 1996
Female: 2:38:22 - Brynhild Synstnes 	 (Norway) 2001

Winners 

Key:

See also
Midnight Sun Run

References

External links
 Official pages online in Norwegian and English
Picture Gallery

Sport in Tromsø
Marathons in Europe
Arctic
Recurring sporting events established in 1990
Marathons in Norway
Summer events in Norway